Hell and High Water is a 1933 American Pre-Code drama film directed by Grover Jones and William Slavens McNutt and written by Grover Jones, Agnes Brand Leahy, William Slavens McNutt and Max Miller. The film stars Richard Arlen, Judith Allen, Charley Grapewin, Gertrude Hoffman, Guy Standing, and William Frawley. The film was released on October 27, 1933, by Paramount Pictures.

Cast 
Richard Arlen as Capt. J.J. Jericho
Judith Allen as Sally Driggs
Charley Grapewin as Peck Wealin
Gertrude Hoffman as Mom Wealin
Guy Standing as Rear Admiral
S. Matsui as Joe Satsanuki
William Frawley as Milton J. Bunsey
Robert Knettles as Barney
Barton MacLane as Dance Hall Manager
Esther Muir as Barney's mother

References

External links 
 

1933 films
American drama films
1933 drama films
Paramount Pictures films
American black-and-white films
1930s English-language films
1930s American films